The V Central American Sports Games (Spanish: V Juegos Deportivos Centroamericanos) was a multi-sport event held in San Salvador, El Salvador between January 10 and January 23, 1994.

Participating nations
Athletes from 7 countries were reported to participate:

 (315)

 Panamá

Sports
The competition featured 27 sports.

Aquatic sports
 Swimming
 Water polo
 Athletics
 Baseball
 Basketball
 Bodybuilding
 Bowling
 Boxing
 Chess
 Cycling
 Equestrian
 Fencing
 Football
 Gymnastics
 Judo
 Karate
 Racquetball
 Sailing
 Shooting
 Softball
 Squash
 Table tennis
 Taekwondo
 Tennis
 Triathlon
 Volleyball
 Weightlifting
 Wrestling

Medal count
The information listed below was obtained from the Costa Rican newspaper La Nación, from El Diario de Hoy, San Salvador, El Salvador, and from El Nuevo Diario, Managua, Nicaragua.

References

 
Central American Games
Central American Games
International sports competitions hosted by El Salvador
Central American Games
Cent
Multi-sport events in El Salvador